Philip Bernard Joseph Cosgrave (2 November 1884 – 22 October 1923) was an Irish Cumann na nGaedheal politician who served as a Teachta Dála (TD) in Dáil Éireann from 1921 to 1923.

He was born at 174 James Street, Dublin, to Thomas Cosgrave, grocer, and Bridget Nixon. He trained for a medical career at the Catholic University of Ireland though did not complete his studies, instead working as a pharmacist.

In 1914 he joined the Irish Volunteers and took part in the 1916 Easter Rising, at the Marrowbone Lane Distillery; he was captured, court-martialed, and sentenced to death, but this was later commuted to five years’ penal servitude.

He was first elected in the 1921 general election for Dublin North-West, and after that constituency's abolition for the 1923 general election he was re-elected for the new Dublin South constituency.

Cosgrave's death, from nephritis, only eight weeks after winning his seat in the 4th Dáil triggered a by-election for his seat. It was held on 12 March 1924 and won by the Cumann na nGaedheal candidate, James O'Mara. Cosgrave was an officer in the Irish army on his death.

His brother, W. T. Cosgrave, was President of the Executive Council of the Irish Free State, his nephew, Liam Cosgrave was Taoiseach from 1973 to 1977 and his great-nephew, Liam T. Cosgrave was a TD for Dún Laoghaire from 1981 to 1987.

See also
Families in the Oireachtas

References

External links
 

1884 births
1923 deaths
Philip
Cumann na nGaedheal TDs
Early Sinn Féin TDs
Deaths from nephritis
Members of the 2nd Dáil
Members of the 3rd Dáil
Members of the 4th Dáil
Politicians from Dublin (city)
People of the Irish Civil War (Pro-Treaty side)